Freiberg is a former district in Saxony, Germany. It was bounded by (from the west and clockwise) the district of Mittlerer Erzgebirgskreis, the city of Chemnitz, the districts of Mittweida, Meißen and Weißeritzkreis, and by the Czech Republic.

History 
The district was established in 1994 by merging the former districts of Freiberg, Brand-Erbisdorf and Flöha. In August 2008, as a part of the district reform in Saxony, the districts of Döbeln, Freiberg and Mittweida were merged into the new district Mittelsachsen.

Geography 
The district was located on the northern slopes of the Ore Mountains. The largest river of the region is the Freiberger Mulde, which rises on Czech territory and from there runs northwards.

Coat of arms

Towns and municipalities

External links 
Official website (German)